Hjördis Viktoria Töpel (4 January 1904 – 17 March 1987) was a Swedish freestyle swimmer and diver who competed at the 1924 Summer Olympics in Paris and at the 1928 Summer Olympics in Amsterdam.

She competed in both diving and swimming at the 1924 Olympics. In swimming she entered the 200m breaststroke, the 100m and 400m freestyle events and the 4×100m freestyle relay. Her team won bronze in the relay and she finished seventh in the breaststroke. She also won an individual bronze medal in the Women's 10m Platform event.

Remarkably, there were two female athletes at the 1924 Olympics who won medals in both diving and swimming. Hjördis Töpel and American Aileen Riggin both won diving and swimming medals, making them the first two female athletes to win medals in two different sports at a single Olympic games.

In 1928 Töpel only competed in diving, alongside her younger sister Ingegärd. They both took part in the Women's 10m Platform event but neither of them advanced into the final round.

References

Further reading

Notes

1904 births
1987 deaths
Divers at the 1924 Summer Olympics
Divers at the 1928 Summer Olympics
Swedish female divers
Swedish female freestyle swimmers
Medalists at the 1924 Summer Olympics
Olympic bronze medalists for Sweden
Olympic bronze medalists in swimming
Olympic medalists in diving
Olympic divers of Sweden
SK Najaden swimmers
Swedish female breaststroke swimmers
Swimmers at the 1924 Summer Olympics
Women's World Games medalists
Swimmers from Gothenburg
20th-century Swedish women